TV 2/Nord is one of eight regional TV-stations in the TV 2 network in Denmark, covering the Northern parts of Jutland. The station was founded the 1. April 1989 and are broadcasting from Aabybro.

Television stations in Denmark
Television channels and stations established in 1989
Mass media in Aabybro